David Young  (born 4 April 1954) is a former Australian rules footballer who played for South Melbourne and Collingwood in the Victorian Football League (VFL).

Young, the 1974 'Best and Fairest' winner at South Adelaide, kicked 23 goals in his first season with South Melbourne in 1977. This included a six-goal haul in just his third league game, against Fitzroy. During the 1979 season, Young crossed to Collingwood and played in a forward pocket in the 1980 VFL Grand Final loss. His time at Collingwood was cut short due to an Achilles tendon injury.

References

Holmesby, Russell and Main, Jim (2007). The Encyclopedia of AFL Footballers. 7th ed. Melbourne: Bas Publishing.

1954 births
Living people
Sydney Swans players
Collingwood Football Club players
South Adelaide Football Club players
Australian rules footballers from South Australia